was a Japanese writer who wrote over 100 screenplays.  He is best known for co-writing screenplays for a number of films directed by Akira Kurosawa, including Ikiru, The Seven Samurai, Throne of Blood and The Hidden Fortress.  His first film with Kurosawa was Ikiru, and according to film professor Catherine Russell, it was Oguni who devised that film's two-part structure.  Film critic Donald Richie regarded him as the "humanist" among Kurosawa's writers.  In 2013, Oguni and frequent screenwriting collaborators Kurosawa, Shinobu Hashimoto and Ryūzō Kikushima were awarded the Jean Renoir Award by the Writers Guild of America West.

Writing credits other than for Kurosawa films include Heinosuke Gosho's Where Chimneys Are Seen in 1953, Koji Shima's Warning from Space in 1956, Bin Kato's Heiji Zenigata: Chase the Demon Lantern in 1958, Tora! Tora! Tora!, and Hiroshi Inagaki's Machibuse  in 1970.

References

External links

1904 births
1996 deaths
Japanese film directors
Writers from Aomori Prefecture
20th-century Japanese screenwriters